"Isn't Life Strange" is a 1972 single by the English progressive rock band the Moody Blues, which was based on Pachelbel's Canon In D. Written by bassist John Lodge, it was the first of two singles released from their 1972 album Seventh Sojourn, with the other being "I'm Just a Singer (In a Rock and Roll Band)", also written by Lodge. "Isn't Life Strange" is one of the Moody Blues' longer songs, lasting for over six minutes. Cash Box described it as "symphonic rock extraordinaire", and also said that it had a "strangely intriguing, euphoric production that stands out in any crowd." Writing for Rock Cellar magazine, Frank Mastropolo rated the song as number 1 in a list of "Top 11 Question Songs". Classic Rock critic Malcolm Dome rated it as the Moody Blues' 4th greatest song. PopMatters critic Sean Murphy rated "Isn't Life Strange" as the 67th best progressive rock song of all time.

Personnel
Original version
 John Lodge – bass guitar, possible acoustic guitar, vocals
 Justin Hayward – electric guitar, vocals
 Mike Pinder – Chamberlin, harmonium, backing vocals
 Ray Thomas – flute, backing vocals
 Graeme Edge – drums, percussion

Chart positions

References

The Moody Blues songs
1972 singles
Songs written by John Lodge (musician)